Aldrich Valley is a valley in Carter County in the U.S. state of Missouri. Aldrich Valley has the name of John Aldrich, a pioneer settler.

References

Valleys of Carter County, Missouri
Valleys of Missouri